Nasim Wali Khan ( 1932 16 May 2021) was a female politician in Pakistan.  Nasim Wali Khan was a 
leader of Awami National Party–Wali. Nasim Wali Khan was the former provincial president and parliamentary leader of the Awami National Party in Provincial Assembly of Khyber-Pakhtunkhwa.

She was born in 1933. She was one of the main leaders of the Pakistan National Alliance and made history in 1977 as the first woman elected from a Khyber-Pakhtunkhwa province general seat in the 1977 election.

Nasim Wali Khan married  Abdul Wali Khan in 1954. She was the mother of Sangeen Wali Khan (late), and Dr Gulalai Wali Khan as well as step-mother of Asfandyar Wali Khan.
Nasim Wali Khan died on 16 May 2021 in Charsadda, Pakistan.

Further reading

See also 
 Khan Abdul Bahram Khan
 Khan Abdul Jabbar Khan
 Abdul Ghaffar Khan
 Abdul Ghani Khan
 Abdul Wali Khan
 Khan Amirzadah Khan 
 Asfandyar Wali Khan
 Sangeen Wali Khan
 Family of Bahram Khan
 Awami National Party

References

Pashtun people
Pashtun nationalists
Awami National Party politicians
Nssim Wali
2021 deaths
1933 births
Women members of the Provincial Assembly of Khyber Pakhtunkhwa
20th-century Pakistani women politicians